Sir Louis Edward Barnett  (1865–1946) was a New Zealand professor of surgery and founder of the Royal Australasian College of Surgeons.

His work at the Otago Medical School, where he was one of the school's earliest students, and with the Royal Australasian College of Surgeons led to the recognition of hydatid disease (see echinococcus), a potentially fatal parasitic disease.

Working and teaching in Dunedin, Barnett established a national reputation for safe and sound surgery. He was the first surgeon in New Zealand to wear rubber gloves and a gauze mask in the operating theatre.

Barnett married Mabel Violet Fulton, daughter of Catherine Fulton and James Fulton, on 31 December 1892.  They had four sons (including Miles Barnett and Sir Denis Barnett) and a daughter.  Barnett retired in 1925 at the age of 60 and moved to Hampden where his home is protected today by Heritage New Zealand.

He was appointed a Knight Bachelor in the 1927 King's Birthday Honours. In 1935, he was awarded the King George V Silver Jubilee Medal.

References

'BARNETT, Sir Louis Edward, C.M.G.', from An Encyclopaedia of New Zealand, edited by A. H. McLintock, originally published in 1966.

1865 births
1946 deaths
New Zealand Companions of the Order of St Michael and St George
New Zealand surgeons
New Zealand Knights Bachelor
University of Otago alumni
Academic staff of the University of Otago